This is a list of notable individuals and organizations who have voiced their endorsement of the Green Party's presidential nominee Jill Stein for the 2016 presidential election.

Elected officials and public officeholders

Current
 Jovanka Beckles, member of the Richmond, California City Council and former vice mayor of Richmond
Cecil Bothwell, member of the Asheville, North Carolina City Council
 Cam Gordon, member of the Minneapolis City Council
 Gayle McLaughlin, member of the Richmond, California City Council and former mayor of Richmond
 Kshama Sawant, member of the Seattle City Council

Former
Robert Caldwell, former councilman for Choctaw-Apache Community of Ebarb, LA
Marsha Coleman-Adebayo, former senior policy analyst for the United States Environmental Protection Agency and racial justice advocate
Charlotte Pritt, former member of the West Virginia House of Delegates and West Virginia State Senate and candidate for Governor of West Virginia, 2016

International political figures
 Joe Higgins, Irish politician, former MP (1997-2007 and 2011–2016), former MEP (2009–2011), and member of the Socialist Party
 George Galloway, former British MP (1987–2010; 2012–2015) (former Leader of the Respect Party)
 Alessandro Di Battista, Italian politician, member of Five Stars Movement.

Activists, humanitarians, and labor leaders
 Patch Adams, activist and physician
 Medea Benjamin,  co-founder of Code Pink and Global Exchange
 Dan La Botz, author, educator, and co-founder of Teamsters for a Democratic Union
 Rosa Clemente, journalist, activist, and Green Party Vice Presidential candidate in 2008
 Howie Hawkins, activist and former Green Party candidate for Governor of New York
 Cheri Honkala, co-founder/national coordinator of Poor People's Economic Human Rights Campaign and Green Party Vice Presidential candidate in 2012
 Camille Paglia, academic and social critic
 Coleen Rowley, former FBI agent and whistleblower
 Harvey Wasserman, senior advisor to Greenpeace USA and the Nuclear Information and Resource Service
 Cornel West, philosopher, academic, social activist, author, member of Democratic Socialists of America, and member of the DNC platform committee
 Kevin Zeese, former executive director of National Organization for the Reform of Marijuana Laws (NORML)
 Richard Stallman, programmer, software freedom activist, founder of FSF and GNU Project
Ray McGovern, former army officer and CIA analyst
Bob Fitrakis, Ohio Green Party Co-Chair
L. Randall Wray, senior scholar, Levy Economics Institute
Dr. Jack Rasmus, Economics Dept, St. Mary's College
Ellen Brown, author and founder of the Public Banking Institute
Richard D. Wolff, Marxian economist

Journalists and media personalities
 Jimmy Dore, host of online talk show The Jimmy Dore Show
 Chris Hedges, author and former New York Times Middle East bureau chief  
 Bill Kauffman,
 Kyle Kulinski, co-founder of Justice Democrats and host of online radio show Secular Talk.
 Marc Lamont Hill,  BET News correspondent, CNN political commentator, and Distinguished Professor of African American Studies at Morehouse College
 Mike Malloy, host of the online talk show The Mike Malloy Show
 Abby Martin, former journalist at RT America and teleSUR English
 Bhaskar Sunkara, political writer; founding editor and publisher of Jacobin
 David Swanson, journalist and author
 Boyce Watkins, author, economist, political analyst, and social commentator

Arts and Entertainment

Actors, entertainers and filmmakers

 Seb Castro
 Craig McCracken
 Rosario Dawson
 Vivian Kubrick
 Viggo Mortensen
 Susan Sarandon
 Oliver Stone
 Isaiah Washington

Musicians
 Cristian Castro
 Lady Miss Kier
 Immortal Technique
 David Rovics
 R.A. the Rugged Man
 Slug

Athletes
Kelly Slater
 Daniel Bryan

Organizations
 Campaign for Peace and Democracy, anti-war political advocacy group 
 International Socialist Organization, a revolutionary socialist organization in the United States
 Oregon Progressive Party, minor political party in Oregon
 Solidarity, a revolutionary socialist organization in the United States
 Socialist Alternative, socialist political party in the United States

References

Stein, Jill, endorsements
Stein, Jill, 2016